Betta omega is a species of gourami. It is native to Asia, where it occurs in the state of Johor in Malaysia. The species reaches 14.77 cm (5.8 inches) in total length. It was described in 2018 by Heok Hui Tan (of the National University of Singapore) and Amirrudin B. Ahmad (of the Universiti Malaysia Terengganu) based on its distinctive patterning. It is believed to be either already extinct or very near extinction, although it has not yet been evaluated by the IUCN. FishBase does not yet list this species.

References 

Osphronemidae
Fish described in 2018
Fish of Malaysia
Taxa named by Heok Hui Tan